The following is a list of Roman tribunes as reported by ancient sources.

A tribune in ancient Rome was a person who held one of a number of offices, including tribune of the plebs (a political office to represent the interests of the plebs), Military tribune (a rank in the Roman army), Tribune of the Celeres (the commander of the king's personal bodyguard), and various other positions. Unless otherwise noted all dates are reported in BC.

List of Tribunes of the Celeres of the Roman Kingdom

The following individuals held the position of Tribune of the Celeres (Tribunus Celerum), the captain of the king's bodyguard who had authority to preside over the Curiate Assembly (Comitia Curiata) during the period of the Roman Kingdom (753–509).

List of tribunes of the plebs of the Roman Republic

The following individuals held the position of tribune of the plebs (tribunus plebis) during the Roman Republic, starting with the creation of the office in 493 BC.

5th century BC 

 493: Lucius Albinius C. f. Paterculus
 493: Gaius Icilius (Viscellius?) Ruga
 493: Lucius Junius Brutus
 493: Gaius Licinius
 493: Publius Licinius
 493: Lucius Sicinius L. f. Vellutus (Bellutus?)
 493: Spurius Icilius
 492: Spurius Sicinius Bellutus (or Spurius Icilius?)
 491: Lucius Sicinius Vellutus
 491: Marcus Decius
 489: Maenius
 486: Gaius Rabuleius
 486: Publius Mucius Scaevola
 486: Spurius Cassius
 483: Gaius Maenius
 481: Spurius Licinius (or Spurius Icilius?)
 480: Titus Pontificius
 476: Titus Genucius
 476: Quintus Considius
 475: Lucius Caedicius
 475: Titus Statius
 473: Gnaeus Genucius
 472: Volero Publilius
 472: Lucius Numitorius
 472: Volero Publilius
 471: Gaius Laetorius
 470: Spurius Icilius
 470: Lucius Mecilius
 470: Lucius Numitorius
 470: Marcus Duillius
 470: Gaius Sicinius
 462: Gaius Terentilius (Terentilius?) Arsa
 462: Sextus Titius
 461: Marcus Volscius Fictor
 461: Aulus Verginius
 460: Aulus Verginius
 460: Marcus Volscius Fictor
 459: Aulus Verginius
 459: Marcus Volscius Fictor
 458: Aulus Verginius
 458: Marcus Volscius Fictor
 457: Aulus Verginius
 457:  Marcus Volscius Fictor
 456: Lucius Alienus
 456: Lucius Icilius S. f.
 455: Lucius Icilius S. f.
 454: Lucius Siccius Dentatus
 454: Gaius Calvius Cicero
 449: Gaius Apronius
 449: Publius Numitorius
 449: Gaius Oppius
 449: Marcus Pomponius
 449: Lucius Verginius
 449: Appius (Publius?) Villius
 449: Lucius Icilius S. f.
 449: Marcuis Duillius
 449: Gaius Sicinius
 449: Marcus Titinius
 448: Aulus Aternius Varus (Varus Fontinalis)
 448: Spurius Tarpeius (Montanus Capitolinus)
 448: Lucius Trebonius Asper
 445: Gaius Canuleius
 445: Gaius Furnius
 442: Poetilius
 439: Quintus Caecilius
 439: Quintus Junius
 439: Lucius Minucius (Esquilinus Augurinus)
 439: Sextus Titinius
 438: Lucius Minucius Augurinus
 436: Spurius Maelius
 423: Gaius Junius
 422: Sextus (Tiberius?) Antistius
 422: Marcus Asellius
 422: Tiberius Spurillius
 422: Sextus Tempanius
 422: Quintus Hortensius
 420: Aulus Antistius
 420: Manius Canuleius
 420: Marcus Canuleius
 420: Sextus Pompilius
 416: Spurius Maecilius (at least four times, the fourth occasion in 416 BC)
 416: Spurius (Marcus?) Metilius
 415: Lucius Decius
 414: Marcus Sextius
 413: Lucius Icilius
 412: Lucius Icilius
 410: Marcus Menenius
 409: Icilius (brother to the other two this year)
 409: Icilius (brother to the other two this year)
 409: Lucius Icilius
 401: Marcus Minucius
 401: Gnaeus Trebonius
 401: Marcus Acutius
 401: Gaius Lacerius
 401: Marcus Metilius
 401: Publius Curatius
 401: Marcus Acutius

4th century BC

3rd century BC 

 300: Quintus Ogulnius (Gallus)
 300: Gnaeus Ogulnius
 298: Marcus Curius Dentatus
 293: Marcus Scantius
 286: Maenius
 286: Aquilius
 285: Gaius Aelius
 279: Maenius
 270: Marcus Fulvius Flaccus
 248: Gaius Fundanius Fundulus
 248: Pullius
 241: Genucius
 232: Gaius Flaminius
 220: Marcus Metilius
 219: Maenius
 218: Quintus Claudius
 217: Quintus Baebius Herennius
 217: Marcus Metilius
 216: Marcus Minucius Augurinus
 216: Lucius Scribonius Libo
 216: Quintus Baebius Herennius
 215: Gaius Oppius
 213: Lucius Caecilius L. f. L. n. Metellus
 213: Marcus Caecilius Metellus
 212: Spurius Carvilius
 212: Lucius Carvilius
 212: Gaius Servilius Casca
 211: Gaius Sempronius Blaesus
 211: Publius Aquilius
 211: Gaius Servilius Geminus
 211: Publius Villius
 210: Marcus Lucretius
 210: Gaius Arrenius
 210: Lucius Arrenius
 210: Lucius Atilius
 210: Marcus Lucretius
 209: Gaius Publicius Bibulus
 204: Marcus Cincius Alimentus
 204: Tiberius Claudius Asellus
 204: Gnaeus Baebius (Tamphilus)
 204: Marcus Claudius Marcellus
 204: Licinius
 204: Marcus Silius
 204: Publius Silius
 203: Gnaeus Baebius (Tamphilus)
 201: Manius Acilius Glabrio
 201: Quintus Minucius Thermus
 200: Quintus Baebius
 200: Tiberius Sempronius Longus

2nd century BC 
Unless otherwise indicated, entries are based on T.R.S. Broughton, Magistrates of the Roman Republic, vol. I (1951).

 199: P. Porcius Laeca
 198: M. Fulvius
 198: M'. Curius
 197: Gaius Acilius Glabrio
 197: Q. Fulvius
 197: L. Oppius (Salinator)
 196: C. Afranius (Stellio?)
 196: C. Atinius Labeo (probably)
 196: C. Licinius Lucullus
 196: Q. Marcius Ralla
 195: M. Fundanius
 195: M. Junius Brutus
 195: P. Junius Brutus
 195: L. Valerius (Tappo)
 194: M. Baebius (Tamphilus) (uncertain)
 193: Q. Aelius Tubero
 193: M. Sempronius (Tuditanus)
 192: C. Titinius
 192: M. Titinius (Curvus?)
 before 192: Plaetorius
 191: P. Sempronius Blaesus
 189: P. Sempronius Gracchus
 189: C. Sempronius Rutilus
 189: (Q.) Terentius Culleo
 188: C. Valerius Tappo
 187: M. Aburius
 187: L. Mummius
 187: Q. Mummius
 187: Q. Petillius
 187: Q. Petillius (Spurinus)
 c. 184: M. Caelius
 184: C. Fannius
 184: C. Minucius Augurinus
 184: M. Naevius
 184: Ti. Sempronius Gracchus
 182: C. Orchius
 180: L. Villius Annalis
 177: Q. Aelius
 177: Licinius Nerva
 177: C. Papirius Turdus
 bef. 175: Plaetorius
 172: M. Lucretius
 172: Q. Marcius Scilla
 172: M. Marcius Sermo
 171: M. Claudius Marcellus
 171: M. Fulvius Nobilior
 170: Cn. Aufidius
 170: M'. Juventius Thalna
 169: P. Rutilius
 169: Q. Voconius Saxa
 168: Cn. Tremellius
 167: M. Antonius
 167: M. Pomponius
 167: Ti. Sempronius
 c. 154: L. Aurelius Cotta
 c. 154: Q. Caecilius Metellus (Macedonicus)
 c. 153: Aelius (probably)
 c. 153: Fufius (probably)
 c. 149: Atinius
 149: L. Calpurnius Piso Frugi
 149: L. Scribonius Libo
 149: M. Scantius (or Scantinius?) (uncertain)
 146: Livius
 145: C. Licinius Crassus
 143: (T.?) Didius
 c. 142: C. Fannius
 141: P. Mucius Scaevola
 140: Ti. Claudius Asellus
 139: A. Gabinius
 138: C. Curiatius
 138: Sp. Licinius
 137: M. Antius Briso
 137: L. Cassius Longinus Ravilla
 137: C. Fannius Strabo
 136: P. Rutilius
 133: (Q.?) Mucius (or Minucius? Mummius?)
 133: M. Octavius
 133: Rubrius
 133: P. Satureius
 133: Ti. Sempronius Gracchus
 132: Pompeius
 131: C. Atinius Labeo Macerio
 c. 130: Q. Aelius Tubero
 130 (or 131): C. Papirius Carbo
 126: M. Junius Pennus
 c. 123: Aufeius
 c. 123: M. Junius (Silanus)
 123: C. Sempronius Gracchus
 c. 122: (M'.?) Acilius Glabrio
 122: M. Fulvius Flaccus
 122: M. Livius Drusus
 c. 122: Cn. Marcius Censorinus
 122: (C.?) Rubrius
 122: C. Sempronius Gracchus
 c. 121: Maevius
 121: Minucius Rufus
 120 (or 121): L. Calpurnius Bestia
 120: P. Decius
 119: C. Marius
 113: Sex. Peducaeus
 111: C. Baebius
 c. 111: C. Licinius Nerva
 111: C. Memmius
 c. 111: Sp. Thorius
 110: L. Annius
 110: P. Licinius Lucullus
 109: C. Mamilius Limetanus
 107: C. Coelius Caldus
 107: L. Licinius Crassus
 107: T. Manlius Mancinus
 106: Q. Mucius Scaevola (Pontifex)
 104: L. Cassius Longinus
 104: Cn. Domitius Ahenobarbus
 c. 104: L. Marcius Philippus
 c. 104: Clodius (possibly)
 103: L. Appuleius Saturninus
 103: L. Aurelius Cotta
 103: (M.?) Baebius (Tamphilus?)
 103: T. Didius
 103: C. Norbanus
 103: L. (Antistius?) Reginus
 102: A. Pompeius
 101: C. Servilius Glaucia 
 100: L. Appuleius Saturninus

1st century BC 
Unless otherwise indicated, entries are based on T.R.S. Broughton, Magistrates of the Roman Republic, vol. II (1952).

References

Bibliography

 Titus Livius Patavinus (Livy), Ab Urbe Condita (History of Rome).
 Dionysius of Halicarnassus, Romaike Archaiologia (Roman Antiquities).
 
 Smith, William (ed. 1870), Dictionary of Greek and Roman Biography and Mythology.
 Marcus Tullius Cicero, Brutus, De Oratore, De Officiis, De Natura Deorum, Epistulae ad Familiares, Laelius de Amicitia, In Verrem, Pro Gaio Rabirio Perduellionis Reo, Florus, Pro Quintus Roscius, Epistulae ad Atticum, Epistulae ad Quintum Fratrem, In Vatinium Testem, Post Reditum in Senatu, De Haruspicum Responsis, Pro Plancio, De Domo Sua, Pro Sestio, Pro Rabirio Postumo, Philippicae.
 Plutarch, The Life of Gaius Gracchus, The Life of Tiberius Gracchus, The Life of Marius, The Life of Pompey, The Life of Crassus, The Life of Cato the Younger, The Life of Cicero, The Life of Caesar, The Life of Antony.
 Macrobius Ambrosius Theodosius, Saturnalia.
 Publius Cornelius Tacitus, Annales (Annals), Historiae (Histories), De Origine et Situ Germanorum (The Origin and Situation of the Germans, or "Germania").
 Stockton, David (1979). The Gracchi. Oxford University Press.
 Cornell, T. J. The Fragments of the Roman Historians (2013)
 Appianus Alexandrinus (Appian), Bellum Civile (The Civil War), Bella Mithridatica (The Mithridatic Wars)
 Gaius Sallustius Crispus (Sallust), Bellum Jugurthinum (The Jugurthine War).
 Auctor, De Viris Illustribus (On Illustrious Men)
 Julius Obsequens, Liber de Prodigiis (Book of Prodigies)
 Marcus Velleius Paterculus, Compendium of Roman History
 Hazel, John. Who's Who in the Roman World, Psychology Press (2001).
 Tyrrell, William B. Biography of Titus Labienus, Caesar's Lieutenant in Gaul. Diss. Michigan State Univ., 1970. 10 May 2007
 Valerius Maximus, Factorum ac Dictorum Memorabilium (Memorable Facts and Sayings).
 Gaius Suetonius Tranquilis (Suetonius), Caligula, The Life Of Caesar
 Quintus Asconius Pedianus, Commentarius in Oratio Ciceronis Pro Milone (Commentary on Cicero's Oration Pro Milone).
 https://web.archive.org/web/20080422073924/http://www.ancientlibrary.com/smith-bio/1334.html
 Chisholm, Hugh, ed. (1911). "Cassius s.v Quintus Cassius Longinus". Encyclopædia Britannica. 5 (11th ed.). Cambridge University Press.
 Gaius Julius Caesar, De Bello Civili (On the Civil War)
 Lucius Cassius Dio Cocceianus (Cassius Dio), Roman History.
 Michel Crawford & Timothy Peter Wiseman, "The Coinage of the Age of Sulla", in The Numismatic Chronicle and Journal of the Royal Numismatic Society, Seventh Series, Vol. 4 (1964), pp. 141–158, Appendix II, pp. 156, 157.

Tribune
Tribune